A Slice of Life is a 1983 Australian comedy film about having a vasectomy directed by John D. Lamond and starring Robin Nedwell, John Ewart and Juliet Jordan.

Plot
Toby Morris enters hospital to remove a cyst from his hand. He wakes up to find not only has the cyst been removed but he has been given a vasectomy. Toby develops a phobia against hospitals and becomes a Casanova. Then he finds that the vasectomy may not have worked after all.

Selected cast
 Robin Nedwell – Toby
 John Ewart – Hughes
 Juliet Jordan – Wendy
 Jane Clifton – Fay
 Caz Lederman – Sally
 Dina Mann – Barbara
 Amanda Muggleton – Eva
 Julie Nihill – Pam
 Lulu Pinkus – Addy

Production
It was filmed in Melbourne from 11 January to 27 February 1982.

Reception
The film was never released theatrically.

References

External links
 

1983 films
Australian comedy films
1983 comedy films
Films scored by Brian May (composer)
1980s English-language films
1980s Australian films